Nathaël Antoine Julian Julan (19 July 1996 – 3 January 2020) was a French professional footballer who played as a forward. He represented Guingamp in Ligue 1, and Le Havre and Valenciennes in Ligue 2.

Career
On 30 June 2016, Julan signed his first professional contract with Le Havre, for three years. On 4 August 2017, in the first round of the Coupe de la Ligue at home to Nîmes Olympique, he scored twice in a 4–4 draw and the winning strike in the subsequent penalty shootout.

After registering three goals and an assist in 14 games over the first half of the season, Julan joined Ligue 1 club Guingamp on a 3-year deal on 31 January 2018. On 10 January 2019, he joined Ligue 2 side Valenciennes, until the end of the season. Eight days later on his debut, he scored to open a 1–1 draw at Châteauroux.

In the last match of his life on 30 November 2019, Julan scored both goals, as Guingamp's reserves beat leaders C'Chartres 2–1 at home in the Championnat National 2.

Personal life and death
Julan was born in Montivilliers, Seine-Maritime, and he was of Guadeloupean descent.

On 3 January 2020, Julan died in a car accident in his Audi Q5 in Pordic, Brittany, after leaving training.

References

External links

1996 births
2020 deaths
People from Montivilliers
Road incident deaths in France
Sportspeople from Seine-Maritime
French footballers
Black French sportspeople
French people of Guadeloupean descent
Association football forwards
Ligue 1 players
Ligue 2 players
Championnat National 2 players
Championnat National 3 players
Le Havre AC players
En Avant Guingamp players
Valenciennes FC players
Footballers from Normandy